Luiz Carlos, Luis Carlos is a given name. Notable people with the name include:

Luiz Carlos Dórea (born 1965), Brazilian boxing and mixed martial arts trainer
Luiz Carlos (footballer, born 1971), Luiz Carlos Guarnieri, Brazilian football defender
Luiz Carlos (footballer, born March 1980), Luiz Carlos Guedes Stukas, Brazilian football centre-back
Luiz Carlos (footballer, born August 1980), Luiz Carlos de Souza Pinto, Brazilian football striker
Luiz Carlos (footballer, born 1982), Luiz Carlos Vieira Junior, Brazilian football midfielder
Luíz Carlos (footballer, born 1985), Luíz Carlos Martins Moreira, Brazilian football defensive midfielder
Luiz Carlos (footballer, born 1988), Luiz Carlos Oliveira de Bitencourt, brazilian football goalkeeper

See also
Luis Carlos (disambiguation)